Santander Bank Polska SA, formerly Bank Zachodni WBK (BZ WBK) (eng. West WBK Bank - the WBK abbreviation below) is a Polish universal bank based in  Wrocław, Poznań and Warsaw. It is the third largest bank in Poland in terms of assets value and the number of outlets. It was formed in 2001 by the merger of Bank Zachodni S.A. and Wielkopolski Bank Kredytowy SA.  Since 2011, the Bank has been owned by the Spanish bank Santander Group.

On 4 January 2013, Bank Zachodni WBK merged with Kredyt Bank which Santander bought from its Belgian owners KBC Bank.  This consolidated its Polish banking business and made Bank Zachodni WBK the third largest bank in Poland by market share. Bank Zachodni WBK has a network of ca. 1000 branches and provides services to 3.5m customers.

On 10 September 2018, Bank Zachodni WBK changed its name to Santander Bank Polska SA. Also, the Bank's headquarters were moved from Wrocław to Warsaw.

In 4th quarter of 2018 year, retail part of Deutsche Bank Polska SA has been incorporated into Santander Bank Polska SA.

History 

In March 1995, the Irish group Allied Irish Banks (AIB) acquired 16.2% of shares in Wielkopolski Bank Kredytowy from the State Treasury. In the following years, the group acquired more WBK shares to buy the control stake (80%) in Bank Zachodni in 1999. On 13 June, pursuant to the resolution of Banking Supervision Commission dated 7 March 2001, Bank Zachodni WBK was established.

On 23 June 2001, the bank's shares were floated on the Warsaw Stock Exchange.

On 30 March 2010, AIB announced the intention to sell its stake in Bank Zachodni WBK S.A, and on 10 September these intentions were confirmed by announcing the buyer – Spanish group Santander which was to buy 70.36% of shares worth EUR 3,1bn from AIB. On 30 March 2011, in a tender offer, Santander acquired 69,912 m company shares taking up 95.67% of its stake.

In 2012, the Santander Group reached an agreement with Belgian KBC Bank on the acquisition of Kredyt Bank, owned by the latter. In the aftermath of acquiring Kredyt Bank by the Santander Group, the two Polish banks merged. The entry in KRS on 4 January 2013, made Bank Zachodni WBK S.A. a legal successor of Kredyt Bank. The merged bank operates as Bank Zachodni WBK and the name Kredyt Bank is used as a trademark of some products.

Capital Group

Santander Bank Polska Group encompasses companies whose core business is brokerage, asset management, investment fund management, leasing, factoring, bancassurance insurance services and private banking. Apart from Bank Zachodni WBK, BZ WBK Group's subsidiaries are:

 Santander Nieruchomości SA
 Santander Asset Management
 Santander Faktor sp. z o.o
 Santander Leasing SA
 Santander Inwestycje sp. z o.o
 Santander - Aviva Towarzystwo Ubezpieczeń Ogólnych SA

Branches and ATMs

Currently, there are 625 Santander's branches in Poland. The own branch network is complemented by franchisee partner outlets managed by individuals who cooperate with the bank based on agency agreements and offer select products and services of Santander Bank Polska. There are 1050 Santander Bank Polska ATMs in Poland.

Foundation

The mission of Santander Foundation established over 10 years ago (until 2001 it operated under the name of “Pomoc Ludziom”) is to invest in the development of talents and passion of children from economically disadvantaged families.

Marketing campaigns

Bank Zachodni WBK creates its image, among others, by means of advertisement/commercial campaigns which feature international celebrities. Among the celebrities who starred in the commercials were: John Cleese, co-founder and member of Monty Python Group, comedian Danny DeVito, selector of Poland's national football team, Leo Beenhakker, French actor, Gérard Depardieu and Antonio Banderas. At the moment, the bank's face is Chuck Norris. In April of this year, Izabela Kuna joined the campaign and is currently advertising the newest BZWBK product – "Worth Recommending Account" with Chuck Norris.

References

External links
 
 

Banks of Poland
Allied Irish Banks
Companies listed on the Warsaw Stock Exchange
Banco Santander
Polish companies established in 2001
Banks established in 2001